Martin Fischer was the defending champion, but champion Daniel Brands defeated him in the quarterfinals.

3rd seed Brands claimed the title, defeating Andreas Beck in the final, 6–4, 7–6(7–3).

Seeds

Draw

Finals

Top half

Bottom half

References
 Main Draw
 Qualifying Draw

Oberstaufen Cup - Singles
Oberstaufen Cup